The 1962 Giro d'Italia was the 45th running of the Giro d'Italia, one of cycling's Grand Tour races. The Giro started in Milan, on 19 May, with a  stage and concluded back in Milan, on 9 June, with a  leg. A total of 130 riders from 13 teams entered the 21-stage race, which was won by Italian Franco Balmamion of the Carpano team. The second and third places were taken by Italian riders Imerio Massignan and Nino Defilippis, respectively.

Teams

A total of 13 teams were invited to participate in the 1962 Giro d'Italia. Each team sent a squad of ten riders, so the Giro began with a peloton of 130 cyclists. Out of the 130 riders that started this edition of the Giro d'Italia, a total of 47 riders made it to the finish in Milan.

The 13 teams that took part in the race were:

Route and stages
The race route was revealed on 19 April 1962 by race director Vincenzo Torriani in Rome.

Classification leadership

One jersey was worn during the 1962 Giro d'Italia. The leader of the general classification – calculated by adding the stage finish times of each rider – wore a pink jersey. This classification is the most important of the race, and its winner is considered as the winner of the Giro.

The mountains classification leader. The climbs were ranked in first and second categories. In this ranking, points were won by reaching the summit of a climb ahead of other cyclists. There were three categories of mountains. The first category awarded 50, 30, and 20 points, while the second distributed 40, 30, 20, and 10 points. Although no jersey was awarded, there was also one classification for the teams, in which the teams were awarded points for their rider's performance during the stages.

Final standings

General classification

Mountains classification

Team classification

References

Citations

Giro d'Italia by year
Giro d'Italia
Giro d'Italia
Giro d'Italia
Giro d'Italia
1962 Super Prestige Pernod